The Supreme Court of Turkmenistan is a constitutional institution in Turkmenistan. It is one of three Turkmen institutions to exercise governmental power and is the highest ranking court in the country. Established in 1992 after the adoption of the Constitution of Turkmenistan, the Supreme Court currently consists of 22 judges who are appointed by the President of Turkmenistan for a 5-year term. It is the successor to the Supreme Court of the Turkmen SSR. The associate judges are divided into three different chambers, each specifically focusing on civil, criminal, and military law. The Supreme Court is affiliated to different regional munincipal, provincial courts, district and city courts, as well as the Supreme Economic Court.

The main tasks of the court include interpreting the Constitution and reviewing the constitutionality any decision made by the Assembly of Turkmenistan. The Supreme Court of Turkmenistan has the ability to review appeals against court and arbitral awards. 

The court consists of the following divisions: 
 Plenum 
 Presidium
 Judicial board for civil cases
 Judicial board for arbitration cases
 Judicial board for administrative cases
 Judicial board for criminal cases

The Supreme Court is headquartered at 86 Ali-Shir Nava'i Street in the capital of Ashgabat.

Chairmen of the Supreme Court 
The Chairman of the Supreme Court of Turkmenistan is appointed by the President of Turkmenistan with the consent of the Mejilis for a term of five years. The chairman is a judge by profession and organizes and manages the work of all national courts.

Notes

Government of Turkmenistan
Turkmenistan
1992 establishments in Turkmenistan